The Thirteenth Council of Ministers of Bosnia and Herzegovina (Bosnian and Croatian: Trinaesti saziv Vijeća ministara Bosne i Hercegovine) was the Council of Ministers of Bosnia and Herzegovina cabinet formed on 23 December 2019, following the 2018 general election. It was led by Chairman of the Council of Ministers Zoran Tegeltija. The cabinet was dissolved on 25 January 2023 and was succeeded by a new Council of Ministers presided over by Borjana Krišto.

Investiture

History
After a one year governmental formation crisis following the 2018 general election, on 5 December 2019, the national House of Representatives confirmed the appointment of Zoran Tegeltija as the new Chairman of the Council of Ministers of Bosnia and Herzegovina. The whole government was confirmed by Parliament on 23 December 2019.

At a national House of Representatives session held on 11 January 2021, a vote of no confidence in Tegeltija took place, due to poor performance results during his term as Chairman of the Council of Ministers, but by the end of the voting, it was clear that Tegeltija was staying as Chairman of the Council of Ministers. Three months later, on 28 April, another vote of no confidence in Tegeltija took place at a House of Representatives session, but again, Tegeltija continued serving as Chairman.

The cabinet was dissolved on 25 January 2023, following the appointment of a new cabinet headed by Borjana Krišto.

Cabinet reshuffle
During the period from December 2019 until May 2020, the office of Minister of Human Rights and Refugees was vacant, with the leading parties in government not finding common ground on naming a new minister; eventually, DNS's Miloš Lučić was decided to take on the role of minister, getting confirmed by Parliament on 15 May 2020. Not even a month after Lučić's appointment, on 2 June 2020, Fahrudin Radončić resigned as Minister of Security over a migration dispute with other members of Tegeltija's government; Radončić proposed the deportation of 9,000 migrants which the cabinet, headed by Tegeltija, voted against. On 23 July 2020, Selmo Cikotić became the new Minister of Security in Tegeltija's cabinet, succeeding Radončić.

In February 2021, Josip Grubeša, the Minister of Justice in the government of Tegeltija, was almost released from his duties as minister after the House of Representatives was on verge of voting for his dismissal, but just narrowly, voted against.

On 12 March 2021, Tegeltija dismissed Miloš Lučić from his duties as Minister of Human Rights and Refugees, the reason being the abolishment of the coalition between Tegeltija's SNSD party and Lučić's DNS. Eighteen days later, on 30 March, the House of Representatives confirmed Lučić's dismissal, but the decision officially never took effect because the national House of Peoples, the upper house of the bicameral Parliamentary Assembly of Bosnia and Herzegovina, didn't confirm the dismissal.

In October 2021, the Minister of Defence in Tegeltija's cabinet, Sifet Podžić, canceled a military exercise between the Serbian Army and the Armed Forces of Bosnia and Herzegovina due to the "bad epidemiological situation in the country and because of the small number of vaccinated members of the Armed Forces." This was met with outrage by Tegeltija, who sent a request for the removal of Podžić as minister to the national Parliament. Some days later, he submitted the decision on the dismissal of Podžić to the House of Representatives. On 26 October, the majority of the House of Representatives members voted against Tegeltija's decision and did not support Podžić's dismissal.

Party breakdown
Party breakdown of cabinet ministers:

Cabinet members
The Cabinet is structured into the offices for the chairman of the Council of Ministers, the two vice chairs and 9 ministries.

References

External links
Website of the Council of Ministers

2019 establishments in Bosnia and Herzegovina
Cabinets established in 2019
2023 disestablishments in Bosnia and Herzegovina
Cabinets disestablished in 2023